The 2020 Iowa IndyCar 250s was an IndyCar Series event that took place from July 17–18, 2020. It made up the fifth and sixth rounds of the series' 2020 season. The race was originally scheduled as a single race for July 18 for 300 laps, but due to the COVID-19 pandemic an additional race had to be added due to cancellations of other races so IndyCar officials made the weekend a doubleheader & shortened each race to 250 laps. The race was also the second event of the 2020 season to allow spectators at the track, however there were restrictions regarding attendance.

Entry list
The entry list for both races were released by IndyCar on July 15 with separate entry lists for both races. The only difference between the two was the main sponsor for Graham Rahal.

All cars run a Dallara safety tub utilizing the IndyCar mandated Universal Aero Kit 18. All cars also will utilized Firestone tires.

Pre-qualifying notes
Racer.com's Robin Miller reported on July 15 that after speaking with IndyCar officials that the qualifying procedure for Iowa would be modified. There would be 1 session of qualifying on July 17, however it would not be a 2 lap average to set the field as was usually done on short ovals, rather lap 1 would set the cars starting position for race 1 and lap 2 would set the cars starting position for race 2.

Combined Qualifying Session, July 17

Race 1 – July 17
All sessions for race 1 took place on Friday, July 17.

The aeroscreen had its first major test when during an aborted restart on lap 157, Ed Carpenter Racing's Rinus VeeKay appeared to slow behind eventual race winner Simon Pagenaud and move to the right, and behind the Dutch rookie, Andretti Harding Steinbrenner Racing's Colton Herta was caught in an accordion affect, launching the No. 88 Honda over the left-rear tire of VeeKay's No. 21 Chevy. Prior to getting significantly airborne, Herta's unimpeded nose – minus its wings – attempted to spear into the left side of VeeKay's cockpit, level with his helmet. With the aeroscreen acting as a vertical barrier, Herta's nose was forced upward, sliding skyward on the screen before hitting the top of the aeroscreen frame and flying over VeeKay's Dallara DW12 chassis. This saved Veekay from apparent serious injury.

Race

Notes:
 Points include 1 point for leading at least 1 lap during a race, an additional 2 points for leading the most race laps, and 1 point for Pole Position.

Race statistics

Lead changes: 7

Average speed:

Championship standings after the race

Drivers' Championship standings

Engine Manufacturer standings

 Note: Only the top five positions are included.

Race 2 – July 18
All sessions for race 2 (except qualifying) took place on Saturday, July 18.

Race

Notes:
 Points include 1 point for leading at least 1 lap during a race, an additional 2 points for leading the most race laps, and 1 point for Pole Position.

Race statistics

Lead changes: 12

Average speed:

Championship standings after the race

Drivers' Championship standings

Engine Manufacturer standings

 Note: Only the top five positions are included.

References

Iowa Corn Indy 300
2020 in IndyCar
2020 in sports in Iowa
July 2020 sports events in the United States